Wa (hiragana: わ, katakana: ワ) is one of the Japanese kana, which each represent one mora. It represents  and has origins in the character 和. There is also a small ゎ/ヮ, that is used to write the morae /kwa/ and /gwa/ (くゎ, ぐゎ), which are almost obsolete in contemporary standard Japanese but still exist in the Ryukyuan languages. A few loanword such as シークヮーサー(shiikwaasa from Okinawan language) and ムジカ・アンティクヮ・ケルン (Musica Antiqua Köln, German early music group) contains this letter in Japanese. Katakana ワ is also sometimes written with dakuten, ヷ, to represent a  sound in foreign words; however, most IMEs lack a convenient way to write this. It is far more common to represent the /va/ sound with the combination ヴァ.

The kana は (ha) is read as “wa” when it represents a particle.

Stroke order

Other communicative representations

 Full Braille representation

 Computer encodings

References

Specific kana